The Chosen One, also known as The One or The Chosen, is a narrative trope where one character, usually the protagonist, is framed as the inevitable hero or antihero of the story, as a result of destiny, unique gifts, and/or special lineage. The trope is similar to the Hero's journey template, where the main difference is that The Chosen One usually doesn't have a choice because of destiny. Chosen One narratives often incorporate Bildungsroman, following the growth of a character from childhood to adulthood. The character's gifts, lineage or destiny are often unknown at the start of the plot or presented to the audience as dramatic irony. The Chosen One trope is rooted in religion and mythology, and often appears in speculative fiction that uses elements of mythology.

Genres

Fantasy 
In fantasy, The Chosen One often has supernatural abilities and a related prophecy.

Anime and manga
In anime and manga, The Chosen One often has exceptional skills in martial arts, a unique ability to inspire others, child-like personality traits, and supernatural abilities.

Science fiction 
In science fiction, The Chosen One often has unique technological and supernatural abilities.

Religion 

Religious figures are sometimes described as fitting into The Chosen One narrative because they are believed to be predestined or have a special connection to the spiritual realm.

Journalism 
Journalism sometimes describes public figures as The Chosen One, often in reference to athletes.

References 

Mythological archetypes
Literary motifs
Fantasy tropes